Raw Material. is a Mars Ill album released in 2000, on Sphere of Hip Hop Records.

Track listing 
 Mars Ill
 Sphere of Hip-Hop
 We'll Live Underground
 Black Market (ft. Playdough of Deepspace5)
 Love's Not (ft. Rahlo of Blacksoil Project)
 Monotone
 Unsound
 Send a Man
 Compound Fractures (ft. Sintax.the.Terrific of Deepspace5)
 Rap Fans (ft. Sharlock Poems of L.A. Symphony)
 Under the Sun (ft. Listener of Deepspace5)
 Sounds of Music (ft. Rahlo of Blacksoil Project and Sintax.the.Terrific of Deepspace5)
 Who Will Answer? (ft. Remnant)
 Indulgent Instrumental #1
 Try Again (ft. Adam Atkins)
 Touch and Go (ft. Sev Statik of Deepspace5)
 Indulgent instrumental #2
 The End

Re-release
The album was re-released in 2002 by Uprok Records.

References

External links

Mars Ill albums